Epic Obsession is the third album of the hard rock and metal band Burning Rain featuring guitar player Doug Aldrich (Revolution Saints, The Dead Daisies) and vocalist Keith St. John. They produced the album that was released on March 17, 2013. The line-up is completed by Sean McNabb (Lynch Mob, Resurrection Kings) on bass and Matt Starr (Mr. Big) on drums.

Track listing
All songs written by Doug Aldrich and Keith St. John except where noted.

Personnel

Keith St. John - vocals, piano
Doug Aldrich - guitars
Sean McNabb - bass guitar, backing vocals
Matt Starr - drums

Additional personnel
Brian Tichy - drums
Jimmy D'Anda - drums
David Donnelly - mastering

References

Burning Rain albums
2013 albums